Prince Krzysztof Mikołaj Artur Radziwiłł (29 July 1898 – 24 March 1986) was a Polish translator and politician, descendant of the well-known aristocratic Radziwiłł family. He was a supporter of the Communist regime in Poland, which gained him the nickname Czerwony książę.

Krzysztof was owner of Staszów estates and member of the Sejm in the Polish People's Republic.

His daughter Anna Radziwiłł broke with his politics, becoming a noted dissident and influential member of Solidarity.

References

1898 births
1986 deaths
People from Legionowo County
Łomża Governorate
Krzysztof Mikolaj Artur
Alliance of Democrats (Poland) politicians
Senators of the Second Polish Republic (1938–1939)
Members of the Polish Sejm 1947–1952